Wahiawa is a census-designated place (CDP) in Honolulu County, Hawaii, United States, on the island of Oahu. It is in the Wahiawa District, on the plateau or "central valley" between the two volcanic mountains that comprise the island. In Hawaiian, wahi a wā means "place of the wa people". The population was 18,658 at the 2020 census.

Lakes and reservoirs are rare in Hawaii, and Wahiawa is unique in being surrounded on three sides by Lake Wilson (also known as Wahiawa Reservoir or Kaukonahua). The town must be reached by either of two bridges on Kamehameha Highway (State Rte. 80) across the reservoir's narrow north and south arms. Outside of the reservoir, the town used to be surrounded by military bases and agricultural fields, but development is making its way up from the increasingly urbanized southern portion of the central plain. Still, there are significant U.S. Army facilities in the area, including Schofield Barracks, Wheeler Army Airfield, and East Range, an Army training area extending into the hills south and east of town. Schofield Barracks alone is larger than Wahiawa CDP. Wahiawa is also home to the United States Navy's Naval Computer and Telecommunications Area Master Station Pacific and the housing community HMR.

The U.S. postal codes for Wahiawa are 96786 and 96857.

Geography 
Wahiawa is located at  (21.502574, -158.022938).

Vehicular routes to the North Shore from Wahiawa are Kamehameha Highway (State Rte. 80) to Haleiwa and Kaukonahua Road (State Rte. 801) to Waialua. Wheeler and Schofield are reached along Wilikina Drive (Wahiawa Bypass) (State Rte. 99), which bypasses Wahiawa from the south bridge, a road that eventually connects to both Kamehameha Highway and Kaukonahua Road northwest of town. Kamehameha Highway continues south (as State Rte. 99) past Wheeler to Mililani Town. Interstate H-2 terminates at Wilikina Drive near the Kamehameha Highway intersection, and is a less congested route southward to Mililani and beyond to Pearl City and Honolulu via Interstate H-1. Kunia Road (State Rte. 750) runs from Wilikina Drive, between Schofield and Wheeler (on the bypass), then southward along the mostly still agricultural western side of the plain to Kunia and Waipahu beyond.

Wahiawa Reservoir or Lake Wilson is Hawaii's second-largest reservoir. It irrigates agricultural fields, including the Dole Pineapple Plantation fields at the northern part of Wahiawa, all the way to Oahu's North Shore, where it empties.

Demographics 

As of the census of 2000, there were 16,151 people, 5,376 households, and 3,956 families residing in the CDP. The racial makeup of the CDP was 11.31% White, 2.02% Black or African American, 0.32% Native American, 45.77% Asian, 9.62% Pacific Islander, 1.83% from other races, and 29.14% from two or more races. 11.00% of the population were Hispanic or Latino of any race.

There were 5,376 households, of which 31.3% had children under the age of 18 living with them, 49.2% were married couples living together, 18.0% had a female householder with no husband present, and 26.4% were non-families. 21.9% of all households were made up of individuals, and 10.5% had someone living alone who was 65 years of age or older. The average household size was 2.97 and the average family size was 3.45.

In the CDP the population was spread out, with 26.1% under the age of 18, 8.6% from 18 to 24, 26.6% from 25 to 44, 19.9% from 45 to 64, and 18.8% who were 65 years of age or older. The median age was 38. For every 100 females there were 94.6 males. For every 100 females 18 and over, there were 91.4 males.

The median income for a household in the CDP was $41,257, and the median income for a family was $46,524. Males had a median income of $32,018 versus $25,287 for females. The per capita income for the CDP was $16,366. 16.7% of the population and 13.5% of families were below the poverty line. Of the total population, 23.8% of those under 18 and 9.9% of those 65 and older were living below the poverty line.

Government and infrastructure
The Honolulu Police Department operates the Wahiawa Substation in Wahiawā.

A satellite gateway for the Iridium satellite phone network is operated by the DISA in Wahiawa.

In the Hawaii State Legislature, Wahiawā is part of Hawaii State House of Representatives district 39 (currently represented by Lei Learmont) and Hawaii State Senate district 22 (currently represented by Donovan Dela Cruz.) In the Honolulu City Council, Wahiawā is part of district 2 (currently represented by Ernest Y. Martin.)

Schools

Public schools
The Hawaiʻi State Department of Education operates Wahiawa CDP's public schools.

Elementary schools in the CDP include ʻIliahi, Kaʻala, and Wahiawā. Wahiawā Middle School is adjacent to but not in the CDP, while Leilehua High School is in the CDP.

Five other schools have Wahiawa postal addresses but are outside the CDP: Samuel K. Solomon Elementary School and Daniel K. Inouye (formerly Hale Kula) Elementary School in Schofield Barracks CDP, Helemano Elementary School in Whitmore Village CDP, and Major Sheldon Wheeler Elementary School and Major Sheldon Wheeler Middle School in the Wheeler Air Force Base CDP and on Wheeler Army Airfield.

Private schools

Elementary schools
Trinity Lutheran Church and School (Lutheran) (in the CDP)
First Baptist Church
Hoʻala School
Abundant Life United Pent Church
Maranatha Christian Academy
Hawaii Matsuritaiko

Bridges
Karsten Thot Bridge (truss bridge, 1932)
Kaukonahua Bridge (1944)
Wilson Bridge

Notable people
 Al Harris, professional football player
 Martin Iosefo, professional rugby player with the U.S. national rugby team
 Lia Marie Johnson, actress, singer and YouTube personality
 Adrian Murrell, professional football player
 Netane Muti, professional football player 
 Kealoha Pilares, professional football player
 Lauvale Sape, professional football player
 Antonio Taguba, military general
 Charles Tuaau, professional football player
 Suzanne Vares-Lum, president, East-West Center
 Tadashi Wakabayashi, professional baseball player
 Corinne Watanabe, judge

Waianae Range

Gallery

References

External links

 Wahiawa Community and Business Association

Census-designated places in Honolulu County, Hawaii